The Ministry of Justice (MOJ) is the government ministry in Vietnam responsible for state administration on development and implementation of laws and regulations, post-review of legal normative documents, control of administrative procedures, and legal dissemination and education. It also governs the execution of civil and administrative judgments, judicial-administrative activities, judicial affairs support, state compensation and execution of judgments and other justice works nationwide; in addition to the implementation of laws and regulations on handling of administrative violations.

Ministerial units
 Department of General Affairs on Legislative Development
 Department of Economic and Civil Legislation
 Department of Criminal and Administrative Legislation
 Department of International Law
 Department of Legal Dissemination and Education
 Department of Planning and Finance
 Department of International Cooperation
 Department of Organisation and Personnel
 Ministry's Inspectorate
 Ministry's Office
 General Bureau of Civil Judgement Execution
 Bureau of Legal Normative Documents Post-Review
 Bureau of Administrative Procedure Control
 Bureau of Civil Status, Nationality, Authentication
 Bureau of Child Adoption
 Bureau of Legal Aid
 Bureau of National Registry of Secured Transactions
 Bureau of State Compensation
 Bureau of Judicial Affairs Support
 Bureau of Information Technology

Administrative units
 Institute of Legal Science
 Academy of Justice
 Hanoi University of Law
 Judicial Publishing House
 Vietnam Law Newspaper
 Democracy and Law Journal

List of ministers

See also

 Justice ministry
 Bộ trưởng Bộ Tư pháp Việt Nam (Minister of Justice of Vietnam)
 Politics of Vietnam

External links
 (VN) and (EN) Official site

Justice
Governmental office in Hanoi
Vietnam, Justice
Vietnam
1945 establishments in Vietnam